Jenny Darroch (born May 26, 1963) is the Dean and Mitchell P. Rales Chair in Business Leadership of the Farmer School of Business at Miami University, former Henry Y. Hwang Dean of the Drucker School of Management at Claremont Graduate University, professor of marketing and entrepreneurship, and author. Her early scholarly work on innovation coincided with the appearance of the National Innovation System (NIS) in New Zealand.

Darroch serves as a regular contributor to the HuffPost. Her articles examine a range of topics including skill sets for recent college graduates, Peter Drucker’s five key principles and the impact of Sustainable Development Goals on business practice.

Biography

Education 
Darroch received a Master of Commerce from the University of Auckland, New Zealand in 1992. She graduated from the University of Otago, New Zealand, with a Ph.D. in Marketing in 2002. Her thesis was on innovation and knowledge management. She taught at New Zealand’s Massey University, Otago University, and the University of Auckland before arriving at the Drucker School of Management at Claremont Graduate University in 2004. In March 2020, Darroch was named the dean of the Farmer School of Business at Miami University in Oxford, Ohio.

Academia 
Darroch’s scholarship focuses on the intersection of government policy and firm strategy. During her career in academia and as a private consultant, she has examined macroeconomic policy, behaviors and practices within organizations, types of innovation and the impact of innovations on consumer behavior.

Darroch developed a methodology for examining New Zealand’s NIS, which was published in the journal Prometheus.

Darroch also co-edited a special issue of the Journal of the Academy of Marketing Science dedicated to Peter Drucker with George Day and Stan Slater, published July 2006.

Organizational involvement 
Darroch is a member of the American Marketing Association, the Academy of Management, and serves on the global steering committee of M2W, the annual Marketing to Women practitioner conference. She serves on the Kent Business School International Advisory Board.

Published works 
 Why Marketing to Women Doesn’t Work: Using Market Segmentation to Identify Customer Needs (2014)
 Marketing Through Turbulent Times (2010)
 Innovation and Knowledge Management (2002)

Awards 
 2014: Los Angeles Business Journal's Women Making A Difference "Rising Star" finalist
 2010–2011: Claremont Graduate University Teacher of the Year (MBA)
 Academy of Marketing Science Award
 Product Development and Management Association (PDMA) Award

References 

Living people
1963 births
University of Otago alumni
University of Auckland alumni